Parinam is a 2005 Bengali film directed by Tanmoy Mukhopadhyay and produced by Jakir Hosen and it stars Sharad Kapoor, Nagma and Victor Banerjee starred as the lead roles. This movie was remade in Bangladesh as Eri Naam Bhalobasha starring Ferdous, Racy, Razzak and Humayun Faridi as the lead roles

Cast
 Victor Banerjee
 Biplab Chatterjee
 Sharad Kapoor
 Kharaj Mukherjee
 Sanjib Dasgupta
 Nagma
 Shakuntala Barua
 Rathin Bose

Music
The film music was composed by Babul Bose.

Soundtrack

References

External links
 Parinam (2005) at the Gomolo

Bengali-language Indian films
2005 films
2000s Bengali-language films
Films scored by Babul Bose